Mehdiabad or Mahdiabad or Mihdiabad may refer to:
 Mehdiabad, Azerbaijan
 Mehdiabad, Iran (disambiguation)
Mehdiabad, Pakistan